Tamara "Tami" Neilson is a Canadian-born New Zealand country & soul singer/songwriter. She is the winner of multiple awards, including the 2014 APRA Silver Scroll Awards and Best Country Song Award; she is also the winner of the Best Country Album at the New Zealand Music Awards in 2009, 2010, 2012, and 2015, and Best Female Artist at the New Zealand Country Music Awards in 2010, 2011 & 2014.

Biography

She grew up as a member of The Neilsons, performing with her parents and two brothers across North America, and continues to co-write much of her work with brother Joshua "Jay" Neilson, who shared her Silver Scroll win as well as producing her first three albums: Red Dirt Angel (2008), The Kitchen Table Sessions, Vol. 1 (2009) and The Kitchen Table Sessions, Vol. II (2011). They also worked together on scoring the New Zealand TV series The Brokenwood Mysteries for its second season in 2015, having previously contributed many songs to the first season's soundtrack.

Her album Don't Be Afraid (2015) debuted at No. 3 on the New Zealand Music Charts, and her previous release Dynamite! (2014) was listed in The Guardian as one of the top ten country albums of the year for 2014. In 2020, her song "Hey, Bus Driver", from the album Chickaboom, won APRA's Best Country Song Award. In 2017, Neilson also appeared as a subject of the documentary Prime Rocks: The New Sound of Country in New Zealand, alongside Marlon Williams, Delaney Davidson, and Barry Saunders from The Warratahs. In November 2020, she appeared on David Hartnell MNZM's Best Dressed List.

Neilson's 2022 album, Kingmaker included the single "Beyond the Stars", a duet with country music legend Willie Nelson, which was released to considerable acclaim after being debuted on stage in a live performance with him, at his Luck Reunion concert in March that year.  The album went on to debut at #1 on the New Zealand charts in July, which was followed by a sold-out concert with the Auckland Philharmonia Orchestra at the Aotea Centre, and a national tour with Chamber Music New Zealand, during which she performed "Beyond The Stars" with Bret McKenzie in Wellington. She also performed at Mariposa Folk Festival in Canada and Tønder Festival in Denmark that year. "Beyond The Stars" was nominated for the APRA Awards (New Zealand) Silver Scroll Award on 1 September 2022.

Neilson's songs have also appeared on Wanted, Nashville, and The Sounds. In 2022, Neilson herself appeared on The Brokenwood Mysteries performing "Ten Tonne Truck" on the episode "Good as Gold".

Personal life
Born in Toronto, Canada, Neilson relocated to Auckland, New Zealand in 2007 where she now resides. She is married to Grant Tetzlaff, a New Zealand Police inspector she first met in 2001. They have two children.

Neilson has Ojibwe ancestry.

Discography

Studio albums

Collaborative albums

Live albums

Singles

As lead artist

As featured artist

Promotional singles

Other charted songs

APRA Awards (New Zealand)
The APRA Awards (New Zealand) are presented annually by Australasian Performing Right Association to recognise songwriting skills, sales and airplay performance by its members. The APRA Silver Scroll Award is awarded purely on the basis of songwriting.

New Zealand/Aotearoa Music Awards
The New Zealand Music Awards are presented annually by Recorded Music NZ recognising outstanding artistic and technical achievements in the recording field. Tami has been nominated multiple times for a number of awards, and won many of them.

Taite Music Prize
The Taite Music Prize is an annual New Zealand music award for the best album from New Zealand. Tami Neilson has been nominated three times.

References

External links
Tami Neilson – Official Home Page

21st-century Canadian women singers
New Zealand women singer-songwriters
21st-century New Zealand women singers
Canadian soul singers
New Zealand country singers
1977 births
Living people
Canadian country singer-songwriters
Māori-language singers
Ojibwe people
Canadian women country singers